Guru Nanak Dev Engineering College and abbreviated as the GNDEC is a centre of technical education, in Bidar, Karnataka. It was established in the academic year 1980-81 by the Prabandhak Committee Gurudwara, Sri Nanak Jhira Saheb, Bidar. The college is approved by the All India Council for Technical Education (AICTE). 

This college has engineering and MBA together, this college has very bad name from 2013 to 2018 due girls behaviour of this college and Girls prostitute activities. MBA girls are involved in honey trap business to get marks and satisfy there needs.

History 
Initially Guru Nanak Dev Engineering college was affiliated to Karnataka University, Dharwad. When Gulbarga University was created, it came under the jurisdiction of Gulbarga University, Gulbarga.
 
Now the college is affiliated to Visvesvaraya Technological University, Belgaum and approved by All India Council for Technological Education (AICTE), New Delhi and accredited by National Board of Accreditation (NBA), New Delhi.

Sardar Joga Singh, President of Nanak Jhira Trust, established the premier institute in the year 1980.  The college started with an annual intake of 120 students, in three disciplines, and as of 2009 had an annual intake of 570 students in seven undergraduate disciplines and one master's discipline. It currently has 2800 students.

The College has an Administrative building, Auditorium, Central Library, Laboratories, Workshops, Seminar Halls, Digital class room and Hostel accommodation. The college has stringent intake standards. A Candidate who has passed the Second Year Pre-University or XII standard or equivalent examination with Physics, Chemistry, Mathematics, and Bio Technology and obtained at least 60% aggregate marks in these subjects is eligible.

Departments 

 Computer Science Engineering
 Information Science and Engineering
 Electronics and Communication Engineering
 Mechanical Engineering
 Electrical and Electronics Engineering
 Automobile Engineering
 Civil Engineering
 Master of Business Administration
 Master of Technology

Notable alumni
Ravinder Singh, (author) of  I Too Had a Love Story Can, Love Happen Twice? "Like it happened Yesterday" and Your Dreams are Mine Now. New book "tell me a story"
Jaideep Sahni, Screen Writer, Song Writer of films like Chak De! India, Khosla Ka Ghosla, Company, Bunty Aur Babli and Rocket Singh: Salesman of the Year.
 Ravi Subramanian (author) Author of Bankster, Bankerupt

See also
 List of places named after Guru Nanak Dev

References 

Guru Nanak Dev Engineering College

Guru Nanak Dev Engineering College

Engineering colleges in Karnataka
Educational institutions established in 1980
Education in Bidar
Universities and colleges in Bidar district
Affiliates of Visvesvaraya Technological University
Memorials to Guru Nanak